Global Underground 006: John Digweed, Sydney is a DJ mix album in the Global Underground series, compiled and mixed by John Digweed. The mix is a retrospective look at a set in Sydney, Australia.

That all changed with the coming of John Digweed and his pal Sasha. Their residency at New York’s Twilo (the former Sound Factory) and extensive national touring propelled the more trancy European sounds and full-on DJ worship phenomenon into the spotlight in a big way. GU006 hit during this incredible period.

The mix was the first GU album to be given a full US release, and helped establish the ongoing success of brand in this notoriously difficult market

Track listing

Disc one
 Fortunato & Montresor - "Imagine (Imagination 1)" – 4:13
 Liquid Language - "Blu Savannah" – 3:43
 Pocket - "Wonky (Head Affect Remix)" – 4:27
 Jan Driver - "Filter" – 5:20
 Shapeshifter - "Flood" – 8:41
 Astral Matrix - "Towards Omega" – 3:13
 Danny Tenaglia - "Elements (The Chant)" – 4:13
 Hong Kong Trash - "Down The River (McBuffalo Mix)" – 8:11
 Abundance - "Spiritual (That Kid Chris Mix)" – 3:28
 Brother Brown - "Slap Me Some Skin" – 8:34
 David Alvarado - "Blue" – 3:13
 Lando Psycho - "Magic Digital Drum" – 5:28
 Albion - "Air" – 6:02

Disc two
 Fata Morgana - "Apache Spur (Silversonic's Smoking Mix)" – 8:02
 Simsalabim - "Rub-A-Dub" – 3:26
 DJ JVM & Georgio - "Velvet Vision" – 5:16
 Kobayashi - "Release (Dub)" – 6:01
 Mortal - "Autobahnana" – 5:30
 Pako - "Steel Blue" – 7:47
 Deepsky - "Stargazer" – 4:28
 Paul van Dyk - "Words (For Love)" – 5:31
 Vintage Millennium - "Propaganda" – 5:46
 Pablo Gargano - "The Unexplained" – 5:37
 The Crystal Method - "Keep Hope Alive (Andy Ling's Re-Coded Dub)" – 7:31
 Ylem - "Out Of It" – 5:23

References

External links

Global Underground
John Digweed albums
1998 compilation albums
DJ mix albums